Araeophylla flavigutella is a species of moth in the family Gelechiidae. It was described by Charles Théophile Bruand d'Uzelle in 1851. It is found in southern France.

References

Araeophylla
Moths described in 1851
Moths of Europe